Roman Jebavý and Andrés Molteni were the defending champions, but Jebavý chose to compete in Montpellier instead. Molteni played alongside Leonardo Mayer, but lost in the final to Marcelo Demoliner and Matwé Middelkoop, 3–6, 6–7(4–7).

Seeds

Draw

Draw

References

External links
 Main Draw

Córdoba Open
Córdoba Open
Copa